Rakow may refer to:

People
Benzion Rakow (1925–1985), rabbi in London, England
Bezalel Rakow (1927–2003), rabbi of Gateshead, England
Ed Rakow (1935–2000), American baseball player
Edward F. Rakow (1861–1942)
Mary Rakow, American novelist

Places

Poland
Raków, Kielce County, village in Świętokrzyskie Voivodeship, historical centre of Polish Unitarianism 
Raków, Greater Poland Voivodeship, village in Kępno County
Raków, Łódź Voivodeship, village in Piotrków County
Raków, Polkowice County, village in Lower Silesian Voivodeship
Raków, Trzebnica County, village in Lower Silesian Voivodeship
Raków, Wrocław County, village in Lower Silesian Voivodeship
Raków, Lubusz Voivodeship, village in Świebodzin County
Raków, Masovian Voivodeship, village in Gostynin County
Raków, Opole Voivodeship, village in Głubczyce County
Raków, Jędrzejów County, village in Świętokrzyskie Voivodeship

Belarus
Rakaŭ, urban settlement in Valozhyn Raion, Minsk Region

Sports
Raków Częstochowa, a football club from Częstochowa, Poland

See also
 Rakov (disambiguation)

Jewish surnames